The 2019 Savannah Challenger was a professional tennis tournament played on clay courts. It was the eleventh edition of the tournament which was part of the 2019 ATP Challenger Tour. It took place in Savannah, Georgia, United States between 29 April and 5 May 2019.

Singles main-draw entrants

Seeds

1 Rankings are as of April 22, 2019.

Other entrants
The following players received wildcards into the singles main draw:
  Jordi Arconada
  Christopher Eubanks
  Cannon Kingsley
  Sebastian Korda
  Tennys Sandgren

The following players received entry into the singles main using their ITF World Tennis Ranking:
  Sandro Ehrat
  Manuel Guinard
  Arthur Rinderknech
  Alexander Ritschard
  Camilo Ugo Carabelli

The following players received entry from the qualifying draw:
  Ricardo Rodríguez
  Evan Zhu

Champions

Singles

 Federico Coria def.  Paolo Lorenzi 6–3, 4–6, 6–2.

Doubles

 Roberto Maytín /  Fernando Romboli def.  Manuel Guinard /  Arthur Rinderknech 6–7(5–7), 6–4, [11–9].

References

External links
Official Website

2019 ATP Challenger Tour
2019
2019 in American tennis
April 2019 sports events in the United States
May 2019 sports events in the United States
2019 in sports in Georgia (U.S. state)